Christine Schaffner (born 3 February 1979) is a Swiss mountain bike orienteer and world champion. She has participated in all seven World MTB Orienteering Championships from 2004 to 2010, and won gold medals in the long distance four times, in 2006, 2008,  2009 and 2010.

Mountain bike orienteering career
Schaffner competed at the 2004 World MTB Orienteering Championships Ballarat, where she placed 16th in the middle distance and 11th in the long distance. At the 2005 World MTB Orienteering Championships in Banska Bystrica she won a silver medal in the middle distance behind Michaela Gigon, and placed 16th in the long course. She participated on the Swiss relay team, which placed 8th. At the 2006 World MTB Orienteering Championships in Joensuu, she won her first gold medal in the long course, ahead of Ksenia Chernykh and Ingrid Stengård, and placed 10th in the middle distance. At the 2007 World Championships in Nove Mesto na Morave she won a bronze medal in the long distance, placed fourth in the middle and fifth in sprint, while the Swiss relay team placed fifth. At the 2008 World MTB Orienteering Championships in Ostróda she won her second gold medal in the long distance, ahead of Marika Hara from Finland. She placed ninth in the sprint. In Ben Shemen in 2009 she again won a world championship gold medal in the long distance, ahead of Sonja Zinkl from Austria. She also won a bronze in the middle, placed 6th in the sprint, and won a silver medal in the relay with the Swiss team.  Schaffner won her fourth gold medal in the long distance at the 2010 World Championships in Montalegre. She also won a silver medal in the sprint, placed fifth in the middle, and sixth in the relay.

She has won the long course at the Swiss mountain bike orienteering championships seven years in a row from 2003.

She lives in the municipality Köniz, and works as a goldsmith and teacher.

References

Swiss orienteers
Female orienteers
Swiss female cyclists
Mountain bike orienteers
1979 births
Living people
Place of birth missing (living people)
21st-century Swiss women